The Sony Cyber-shot DSC-RX10 is a digital superzoom bridge camera made by Sony. It was announced on October 16, 2013. 

It has 20 Megapixels and supports video recording with 1080p at up 60 fps. Its single-axis articulating screen can tilt upwards-facing. The lens is labelled with focal length markers. It can be connected to a smartphone through NFC and WiFi Direct.

In comparison to its main competitor, the Panasonic Lumix DMC-FZ1000 released the following year, it is equipped with an ND filter, is weather-sealed, the 2.8 aperture remains constant throughout its 8.3× optical zoom, and the unit is equipped with two rotary knobs around the lens, a numerical and backlit top display for quick review of photography parameters including exposure and ISO and battery level, and an additional mode dial-like knob for exposure value, and  3.5mm headphone connector, whereas the FZ1000 is equipped with twice the optical zoom, 2160p (4K) video, slow motion video with 100fps at 1080p, faster launching and autofocus and burst shot, a two-axis articulating screen, and five function buttons.

References

RX10
Cameras introduced in 2013